Triton is a British period television drama series which aired in four parts on BBC 1 in 1968. It is a remake of the 1961 BBC series of the same title about two undercover Royal Navy officers attempting to discover the secret weapon with which Napoleon plans to invade England. It turns out to be an early submarine designed by the American inventor Robert Fulton. It was followed by a sequel Pegasus in 1969.

A copy of the series exists in the archives of the British Film Institute.

Cast
 Jonathan Adams as Captain Julius Belwether
 Paul Grist as Lieutenant Simon Lamb
 Robert Cawdron as Robert Fulton
 Alan Downer as  Interpreter
 Maurice Browning as Marquis de St. Cloud
 Moris Farhi as  French Captain
 Ric Felgate as Lieutenant Singleton
 Terry Scully as Horatio Nelson
 Hamilton Dyce as John Jervis
 Tony Boyd as Napoleon Bonaparte
 Kathleen Helme as Madame Victor

References

Bibliography
Ellen Baskin. Serials on British Television, 1950-1994. Scolar Press, 1996.
Sue Parrill. Nelson's Navy in Fiction and Film: Depictions of British Sea Power in the Napoleonic Era. McFarland, 2009.

External links
 

BBC television dramas
1968 British television series debuts
1968 British television series endings
English-language television shows